Henry Arundell, 8th Baron Arundell of Wardour (31 March 1740 – 4 December 1808) was a British nobleman in the 18th century. He married Mary Christina Conquest, in 1763.

Biography 
Henry Arundell was born on 31 March 1740, to Henry Arundell and Mary Bellings-Arundell. 

He married Mary Christina Conquest, the daughter of Benedict Conquest of Irnham Hall and Mary Ursula Markham, on 31 May 1763. They had a London home in Grosvenor Square. They had two daughters: Mary Christina (1764–1805), who married James Everard Arundell, 9th Baron Arundell of Wardour, and Eleanor Mary (1766–1835), who married Charles Clifford, 6th Baron Clifford of Chudleigh.

An avid collector of art, he accumulated immense debts in building and furnishing New Wardour Castle, Wiltshire, designed in the Palladian style by Giacomo Quarenghi. A portrait was painted of him by Sir Joshua Reynolds.

He died on 4 December 1808, aged 68. After his death, his trustees were forced to sell off a portion of his lands in Dorset.

See also
Baron Arundell of Wardour

References

External links
Portrait, Dayton Art Institute – archived August 2006

1740 births
1808 deaths
Henry08
8